The  is a 26.3 km railway line owned by the Heisei Chikuhō Railway. The line runs west along the Ima River from Yukuhashi to Tagawa, all within Fukuoka Prefecture.

History

Kyushu Railway was nationalized in 1907 and was merged into Japanese Government Railway, where it was named the Tagawa Line. In 1942, the line was extended south from Ita Station (now Tagawa-Ita Station) to Hikosan Station. The portion between Hikosan and Soeda Station was later reorganized into the Hita Line (now Hitahikosan Line) in 1956, and the section between Soeda and Ita was also merged into the same line in 1960 to form the current Tagawa Line.

Between 1899 and 1973, a short freight-only branch line ran north from Kawara Station (now Magarikane Station) to Natsuyoshi.

Ridership suffered with the decline and closure of the Chikuhō coal mine. Therefore, JR Kyushu, the successor of Japanese Government Railway, privatized and transferred the Ita Line, Itoda Line, and Tagawa Line to the newly founded Heisei Chikuhō Railway in 1997.

Operations
The line is not electrified and is single-tracked for the entire line. Some services continue past Tagawa-Ita Station on the Ita Line to Nōgata Station.

Both sites were registered as national cultural heritage sites in 1999.

Stations
All stations are within Fukuoka Prefecture.

References

 
Railway lines in Japan
Rail transport in Fukuoka Prefecture
Railway lines opened in 1895
Japanese third-sector railway lines